is a live video by Japanese singer/songwriter Chisato Moritaka. Recorded live at the NHK Hall in Shibuya, Tokyo on March 3, 1990, the video was released on September 18, 2013 by Warner Music Japan on Blu-ray and DVD formats; each with a two-disc audio CD version of the concert. A limited edition Blu-ray box set includes a bonus DVD of the March 7 concert at Tokyo Kōsei Nenkin Kaikan, a digitally remastered version of the Moritaka Land CD, a 68-page booklet, a miniature reprint of the original tour pamphlet, three original photos, and a full-size poster. The video was released to coincide with the 25th anniversary of Moritaka's music career, as well as her return to the music industry after retiring in 2000.

The video peaked at No. 5 on Oricon's Blu-ray chart and at No. 32 on Oricon's DVD chart.

Track listing 
Blu-ray/DVD

CD

Box set bonus DVD – Moritaka Land Tour 1990.3.7 at Tokyo Kōsei Nenkin Kaikan

Personnel 
 Chisato Moritaka – vocals, keyboard, rhythm guitar
 The Sindbads
 Yasuaki Maejima – keyboards
 Shin Kōno – keyboards
 Hiroyoshi Matsuo – guitar
 Masafumi Yokoyama – bass
 Makoto Yoshiwara – drums

Charts

References

External links 
  (Chisato Moritaka)
  (Warner Music Japan)
 

2013 live albums
2013 video albums
Chisato Moritaka video albums
Japanese-language live albums
Japanese-language video albums
Live video albums
Warner Music Japan albums